Sultan Banks (February 26, 1979 – January 2, 2022), better known as Traxamillion, was an American hip hop producer from San Jose, California. He  produced records such as Keak da Sneak's "Super Hyphy" and Dem Hoodstarz "Grown Man Remix". His first album, The Slapp Addict, was a compilation of Bay Area hyphy artists and was released August 22, 2006.

Traxamillion also released a mixtape called The Slapp Addict Mixtape, which features mainstream artists as well as local Bay Area artists, and was responsible for producing the remix of "About Us" by Brooke Hogan featuring E-40. In addition to being a producer, Traxamillion also rapped, which he demonstrated on tracks such as "Bring It Back" and "Skrape" on The Slapp Addict. His song "The Movement" is featured on College Hoops 2K7.

In 2010, Traxamillion signed with 454 Life Entertainment after producing the label's second single "We Get Money" by Drew Deezy and Thai VG featuring Glasses Malone. He went on to produce a majority of the label's compilation album "As Real As It Gets".

In 2017, Traxamillion was diagnosed with "a rare form of cancer". On January 2, 2022, he died from the disease, aged 42, while under hospice care at his aunt's home in San Jose.

Discography

Albums 
2006: The Slapp Addict
2012: My Radio
2016: The Tech Boom
2020: For The City  (with City Shawn)
2021: Sirens

Mixtapes 
2007: Ridin' High
2012: Traxamillion Did It

EPs 
2016: The Trapp Addict
2018: Traxamillion Presents: It Was a Hot Summer  (with Ziggy)

Singles

2005: "Super Hyphy" (feat. Keak Da Sneak)
2006: "From The Hood" (feat. The Jacka, Husalah and San Quinn)
2006: "Sideshow" (feat. Mistah F.A.B. and Too Short)
2006: "Club Stuntin" (feat. The Pack)
2006: "Gas, Skrape" (feat. Izz Thizz)
2006: "On Citas" (feat. Keak Da Sneak)
2006: "Cruisin Down The Avenue" (feat. Soz). Produced by Traxamillion 
2006: "Yellow Bus" (feat. Mistah F.A.B.)
2006: "About Us (remix)" (feat. Brooke Hogan and Paul Wall)
2007: "Radar" (feat. Izz Thizz)
2007: "San Francisco Anthem" (feat. San Quinn, Big Rich, and Boo Banga)
2007: "White Kids Aren't Hyphy" (MC Lars)
2009: "808"
2010: "We Get Money" Drew Deezy, Thai, Feat. Glasses Malone & Matt Blaque. Produced by Traxamillion
2010: "I Don't See Nothing Wrong" Drew Deezy, Thai, Feat. Bobby V.. Produced by Traxamillion
2012: "Boy" (feat. Clyde Carson and Ya Boy) Produced by Traxamillion
2012: "Boy(Russian Remix)" (feat. Clyde Carson, SIFO, Seva Rizhsky, HarmLess, Dan_D) Produced by Traxamillion
2013: "Real One"
2016: "Mood RN" (feat. Flammy Marciano)
2020: "I Don't Wanna Dance" (feat. City Shawn and Too $hort)
2021: "Handstand" (feat. Shanti and Krissy Blanko)
2021: "Been Awhile" (feat. Mickey Shiloh)
2021: "Madness" (feat. Chenelle McCoy)

Guest appearances
2007: "Somebody Like You" (Chantelle Paige feat. Traxamillion)  (he co-wrote and produced the track as well).
2008: "Lil Mama" (Roderick feat. Traxamillion) (he only produced the track)
2014: "Rich Boy" (J Shabs Ft. Milla, MultiMilanaire, Traxamillion) (He co-produced the beat alongside MultiMilanaire)
2015: "Elevators" (Fly Commons feat. Nio Tha Gift, Erk Tha Jerk, Traxamillion) (he co-produced the beat)

References

External links
 "Tell Me When To Go! Hyphy: The Oakland Music Craze Sweeping The Nation" - Video interview on CBS5 News
 "You Got Bus'd: Traxxamillion" - Yellow Bus Radio (Mistah F.A.B.) Podcast on Wild 94.9
 Traxamillion Myspace

1979 births
2022 deaths
African-American male rappers
Rappers from Los Angeles
Musicians from San Jose, California
21st-century American rappers
21st-century American male musicians
21st-century African-American musicians
20th-century African-American people
Deaths from cancer in California